Zaven is an Armenian given name. Notable people with the name include:

 Zaven I, catholicos of the Armenian Apostolic Church
 Zaven I Der Yeghiayan of Constantinople, Armenian Patriarch of Constantinople
 Zaven Badoyan, Armenian football player
 Zaven Collins (born 1999), American football player
 Zaven Khatchaturian, neuroscientist and Alzheimer's disease researcher
 Zaven Andriasian, Armenian chess Grandmaster
 Zaven Yaralian, American football coach
 Zaven Paré, French new media artist
 Zaven Biberyan, Turkish writer, editor, and author of Armenian descent
 Zaven Kouyoumdjian, Lebanese talk show host, producer and television personality
 Zaven Almazyan, Soviet serial killer and rapist
 Leon Zaven Surmelian, Armenian-American author

Armenian given names